Horacio Zeballos defeated Rafael Nadal in the final, 6–7(2–7), 7–6(8–6), 6–4 to win the singles tennis title at the 2013 Chile Open. It was Nadal's first tournament in eight months.

Juan Mónaco was the defending champion, but lost to Guillaume Rufin in the second round.

Seeds
The top four seeds receive a bye into the second round.

Draw

Finals

Top half

Bottom half

Qualifying

Seeds

Qualifiers

Draw

First qualifier

Second qualifier

Third qualifier

Fourth qualifier

References 
Main Draw
Qualifying Draw

VTR Open - Singles
2013 Singles